Ala Addin Mahdi (born January 1, 1996) is a Yemeni footballer who plays as a left back for Omani club  Majees.

International career
Mahdi earned his first cap on the Yemen national football team during a 2013 AFC Asian Cup qualification match against Qatar, but did not play. He made his debut in 2015, at a World Cup qualification match against Philippines.
He was selected for the Yemeni squad at the 2019 AFC Asian Cup.

References 

Living people
Yemeni footballers
Yemen international footballers
Yemeni expatriate footballers
1996 births
Al-Ahli Taizz SC players
Al Sha'ab Ibb players
Majees SC players
Yemeni League players
Oman Professional League players
Yemeni expatriate sportspeople in Oman
Expatriate footballers in Oman
2019 AFC Asian Cup players
Association football defenders